William Kessen (January 18, 1925 – February 13, 1999) was an American psychologist, educator, and historian of science. He was Eugene Higgins Professor of Psychology and Professor of Pediatrics at Yale University.

References

1925 births
1999 deaths
20th-century American psychologists
American historians of science
20th-century American educators
20th-century American historians
20th-century American male writers
American male non-fiction writers